Muhammad bin Abdul-Rahman al-Arifi (born 15 July 1970) is a Saudi Arabian author and Da'i. He is a graduate of King Saud University, and member of the Muslim World League and the Association of Muslim Scholars.

Social media popularity 
Al-Arefe has over 20 million followers on Twitter. As of 6 May 2019, Al-Arefe had over 24 million likes on Facebook, which places his account in the top 100 worldwide, and #10 in the Arab world and in the Middle East. BBC claims that Al-Arefe is regarded as a scholar "Brad Pitt". Al-Arefe announced his fatwa for "jihad" against Syrian to his jihadist followers on social media.

Al-Arefe engaged in a diatribe against Shias, referred to them as "evil", used the label of "infidel" against Shia cleric Ayatollah Sistani and boasted that there are no mausoleums, public statues, Christian crosses in Saudi Arabia. Al-Arefe described Jews as cowardly in battle and claimed that their tanks had urine and feces in them since they wouldn't get out of them. He also claimed they used bags or diapers in the tank. He described Jews as too cowardly to fight and said they were going to hide around the Gharqad trees they were allegedly planting.

Al-Arefe supported the Muslim Brotherhood in Egypt. Al-Arefe was lauded by Egyptian Muslim Brotherhood President Mursi and al-Arefe and Salman al-Ouda were named as Muslim Brotherhood sympathizers. He is a known associate of them.

Muslim Brotherhood affiliation was denied for Arefe and Adil al-Kalbani by al-Kalbani, saying that they are affiliated with the Union of Muslim Scholars.

A video Al-Arefe was posted by Ibrahim al-Musalem on a tweet about the Charlie Hebdo shooting.

Holiday celebrations and greetings to Christians by Muslims was banned by Al-Arefe. He strictly explicitly banned religious greetings to non-Muslims. Al-Arefe forbade the usage of Christmas trees.

He said that Syria jihad is incumbent and did apologia for al-Nusra, visiting the Imam Muhammad ibn Abd al-Wahhab Mosque in Qatar.

In July 2015, Al-Arafe wrote a critique on Facebook of the Egyptian Ramadan TV series Jewish Quarter, complaining that it showed Jews in a positive light, when in reality Jews were terrible people. It was picked up by Arabic media.

Al-Arefe had a discussion with Saudi Deputy crown prince Mohammad bin Salman Al Saud and then tweeted and posted a photo of them smiling together. The discussion was held on the same day as Saudi Vision 2030 began. He asked God to bless Prince Mohammad and posted his thanks. al-Arefe met with Prince Mohamed bin Salman again and talked with him and posted the photo of them smiling together on Twitter. They talked about the futures of the Islamic world and of the Kingdom (of Saudi Arabia).

King Saud University employs Al-Arefe.

Arifi on Twitter vowed for Russia and Assad to be defeated over the Battle of Aleppo.

Condolences over the death of the son of Salman al-Ouda and his wife were given on Twitter by Mohamad al-Arefe.

Abdul Razzaq al-Mahdi, Nabil Al-Awadi, Tariq Abdelhaleem, and Hani al-Sibai who are linked to Al-Qaeda, in addition to others like Adnan al-Aroor, Abd Al-Aziz Al-Fawzan, Mohamad al-Arefe, Abdul Rahman Al-Sudais, Abdul-Aziz ibn Abdullah Al Shaykh and others were included on a death list by ISIS.

Al-Arefe's Twitter account was suspended in 2018. Since that time he was rarely seen in public. In February 2021 it was reported that al-Arefe is under watch by Saudi government authorities and that his moves and actions are being followed using spy devices and a tracking knee band.

The 2013 Egyptian coup d'état 

In July 2013, Al-Arefe was detained by the Saudi authorities for using YouTube to criticize the military coup d'état in Egypt, an ally of Saudi Arabia. It was speculated that the arrest was in response to a complaint filed by the Egyptian Ministry of Foreign Affairs to its Saudi counterpart. The complaint claimed that Al-Arefe was intervening in Egyptian domestic affairs. Before his release, he signed a pledge not to interfere in Egyptian affairs and was released afterwards but placed under house arrest. He was also banned from traveling to Doha, where he was scheduled to deliver a religious lecture there. The Saudi authorities never announced the reason behind Al-Arefe's arrest.

Sanctions 
In May 2013, Al-Arefe was banned from entering Switzerland for a period of 5 years, for holding extreme views, Switzerland said.

In March 2014, he was banned by the Home Office from returning to Britain after a series of sermons in Cardiff, Birmingham and London. A Home Office spokesperson said: "We can confirm Mohammad Al-Arefe has been excluded from the United Kingdom. The Government makes no apologies for refusing people access to the UK if we believe they represent a threat to our society. Coming here is a privilege that we refuse to extend to those who seek to subvert our shared values."

In October 2014, he was jailed for 40 days for stating that the train linking Mecca and other holy sites was "one of the worst in the world".

Denmark banned him from entering the country for two years in May 2017.

See also 

 Islam in Saudi Arabia
 Yusuf al-Qaradawi
 Salman al-Ouda
 Aid al-Qarni
 Mohammed Rateb al-Nabulsi
 Tareq Al-Suwaidan
 Omar Abd al-Kafi

References

External links

https://web.archive.org/web/20180301071056/http://arefe.com/ 
https://twitter.com/MohamadAlarefe
https://plus.google.com/110212684724359342394
https://www.facebook.com/3refe
https://www.youtube.com/channel/UCaNS3on9m_7LmSpI2GC65Bw
https://www.youtube.com/channel/UCpTD6Gq8vmoVss-gyntOBJg
https://www.youtube.com/user/hamode656

1970 births
Living people
20th-century imams
21st-century imams
Saudi Arabian imams
Saudi Arabian Salafis
Saudi Arabian activists
21st-century Muslim scholars of Islam
Saudi Arabian writers
Critics of Shia Islam
Islam and antisemitism
Critics of atheism